Air Vice-Marshal David John Edwin Cooper,  is a senior Royal Air Force officer.

RAF career
Cooper was commissioned into the Royal Air Force (RAF) on 27 March 1988. He became officer commanding No. 617 Squadron RAF in April 2008. He went on to be Station Commander RAF Marham in November 2011, Director Air Operations for NATO in November 2013 and Joint Force Air Component Commander in Afghanistan in November 2014. He was awarded the Queen's Commendation for Valuable Service for service on this tour. He became the Air Officer Commanding No. 2 Group RAF in June 2017.

Cooper was appointed a Commander of the Order of the British Empire in the 2014 Birthday Honours.

References

Commanders of the Order of the British Empire
Living people
Royal Air Force air marshals
Royal Air Force personnel of the Iraq War
Royal Air Force personnel of the War in Afghanistan (2001–2021)
Year of birth missing (living people)
Recipients of the Commendation for Valuable Service